Angela Arcangeli (born 12 April 1971) is an Italian basketball player. She competed in the women's tournament at the 1992 Summer Olympics.

References

1971 births
Living people
Italian women's basketball players
Olympic basketball players of Italy
Basketball players at the 1992 Summer Olympics
Sportspeople from Rimini